Jakopin is a Slovene surname. As of 2020, it is the 1107th most common surname in Slovenia.

 Gitica Jakopin (born 1928), Slovene poet, author and translator, mother of Primož and Japec
 Franc Jakopin (1921–2002), Slovene linguist, slavist, lexicographer and onomastist, father of Primož and Japec
 Japec Jakopin (born 1951), Slovene yacht concept designer, son of Franc and Gitica
 John Jakopin (born 1975), Canadian ice hockey player
 Primož Jakopin (born 1949), Slovene computer scientist and linguist, son of Franc and Gitica

References 

Slovene-language surnames